Jean Wendling (born 29 April 1934 in Bischheim, Bas-Rhin) is a French former football defender. He played for France in the Euro 1960.

Titles
French championship in 1960, 1962 with Stade de Reims

References
Profile
Stats

1934 births
Living people
Sportspeople from Bas-Rhin
French people of German descent
French footballers
France international footballers
Association football defenders
RC Strasbourg Alsace players
Toulouse FC players
Stade de Reims players
1960 European Nations' Cup players
ASPV Strasbourg players
Ligue 1 players
Footballers from Alsace